Marcel Lussier (born June 30, 1944) is a Canadian politician and the former Member of Parliament for the riding of Brossard—La Prairie. Lussier was born in Saint-Damase, Quebec.

Lussier was an unsuccessful candidate for the Parti Québécois in La Pinière in the 2003 Quebec election.  He ran for office as a member of the Bloc Québécois in the 2004 federal election, but was defeated by Jacques Saada. In the 2006 election he ran again, defeating Saada by approximately two per cent of the vote. He served as the party's critic for Environment.

Prior to being elected, he had worked as an engineer. In 1968 he earned a Master of Science degree in health engineering from École Polytechnique, and then went on to earn a bachelor's degree in applied science for civil engineering in 1970 from Université de Sherbrooke. He worked at Hydro-Québec for 22 years as an environmental engineering specialist.

He was initially declared re-elected in the 2008 election, but a judicial recount later declared that he had been defeated by Alexandra Mendès of the Liberals. In the 2011 election he lost again, to Hoang Mai of the NDP.

In June 2022, Lussier won the 70 million dollar jackpot in the Lotto Max lottery

Electoral record

References

External links
 

1944 births
Bloc Québécois MPs
Living people
Members of the House of Commons of Canada from Quebec
People from Brossard
Université de Sherbrooke alumni
21st-century Canadian politicians